A pangram or holoalphabetic sentence is a sentence using every letter of a given alphabet at least once. Pangrams have been used to display typefaces, test equipment, and develop skills in handwriting, calligraphy, and keyboarding.

Origins
The best-known English pangram is "The quick brown fox jumps over the lazy dog". It has been used since at least the late 19th century, was used by Western Union to test Telex/TWX data communication equipment for accuracy and reliability, and is now used by a number of computer programs to display computer typefaces.

Short pangrams
Short pangrams in English are more difficult to devise and tend to use uncommon words and unnatural sentences. Longer pangrams afford more opportunity for humor, cleverness, or thoughtfulness.

The following are examples of pangrams that are shorter than "The quick brown fox jumps over the lazy dog" (which has 35 letters) and use standard written English without abbreviations or proper nouns:

"Waltz, bad nymph, for quick jigs vex." (28 letters)
"Glib jocks quiz nymph to vex dwarf." (28 letters)
"Sphinx of black quartz, judge my vow." (29 letters)
"How quickly daft jumping zebras vex!" (30 letters)
"The five boxing wizards jump quickly." (31 letters)
"Jackdaws love my big sphinx of quartz." (31 letters)
"Pack my box with five dozen liquor jugs." (32 letters)

Perfect pangrams
A perfect pangram contains every letter of the alphabet only once and can be considered an anagram of the alphabet.

Other writing systems may present more options: The Iroha is a well-known perfect pangram of the Japanese syllabary, while the Hanacaraka is a perfect pangram for the Javanese script and is commonly used to order its letters in sequence.

Other languages using the Latin script
Whereas the English language uses all 26 letters of the Latin alphabet in native and naturalized words, many other languages using the same alphabet do not. Pangram writers in these languages are forced to choose between only using those letters found in native words or incorporating exotic loanwords into their pangrams. Some words, such as the Gaelic-derived whisk(e)y, which has been borrowed by many languages and uses the letters k, w and y, are a frequent fixture of many foreign pangrams.

There are also languages that also use other Latin characters that do not appear in the traditional 26 letters of the Latin alphabet. This differs further from English pangrams, with letters such as ə, ɛ, and ɣ.

Azeri  ("Zəfər, take your jacket and cap, it will be very cold tonight") is a pangram that contains all 32 letters from the Azeri alphabet.

Czech  ("A horse that was too yellow moaned devilish odes") is the most commonly used one, especially to test alphabet support with fonts. This sentence includes all Czech letters with diacritics, but not all basic letters. To include all basic letters, including letters that only occur in loanwords (g, q, w, x), this one is used:  ("May the sinful saxophones of devils echo through the hall with dreadful melodies of waltz, tango and quickstep.").

Danish  ("Tall shy groom won naughty sexquiz on wc") A perfect pangram, using every letter exactly once (Including the more unusual letters as q, w, and x, and including the Danish æ, ø, and å).

Esperanto ("Maybe every quasi-fitting bungle-choir makes a human type happy.")
  ("According to Ludwig Zamenhof, fresh Czech food with spices tastes good.")

Ewe  ("Have a nice birthday tonight, it's been a long time no see, it's been a while since we were in school. Good afternoon, yes, see you again at twelve o'clock in the morning.") is a two-part pangram consisting of a statement and response.

Finnish  (Although difficult to translate because of its non-practical use, but roughly means to "a whinge of a sleazy lover") A perfect pangram not using any of the special letters used in Finnish only for foreign words (b, c, f, q, š, w, x, z, ž, å).
  ("It is rather fun that bicycles are a daily phenomenon on the countryroads.") An imperfect pangram not containing the previously mentioned special letters.
  ("Viennese rich zombie who can speak Sioux likes Åsa's Roquefort tacos") contains all the letters of the Finnish alphabet.

French  ("Take this old whisky to the blond judge who is smoking") uses each basic consonant once, though not any letters with diacritics. The letters k and w are only found in loanwords.

German  ("Victor chases twelve boxers across the Great Levee of Sylt") contains all letters, including the umlauted vowels (ä, ö, ü) and ß. The letter y is limited to loanwords and proper names like Sylt.

Icelandic  ("If a new axe were here, thieves would feel increasing deterrence and punishment") contains all 32 letters in the Icelandic alphabet including the vowels with diacritics (á, é, í, ó, ú, ý, and ö) as well as the letters ð, þ, and æ. It does not include the letters c, q, w and z.

Irish  ("A large black cat ate the rotten fish promptly") has 31 letters and includes all 20 letters found in native Irish words.

Italian  ("A lunch of water makes twisted faces") has 26 letters and includes all 21 letters found in native Italian words.

Kurdish  ("There were more than four beautiful flowers near the filthy Feqo") has 42 letters and includes all 31 letters found in Kurdish words. This pangram was created by Îrec Mêhrbexş in 2023.

Polish  ("The watchman pushed the bone into a quiz of the musics or a fax of the washes") Perfect pangram, using every letter once, including foreign letters q, v, and x.

Spanish  ("Benjamin ordered a kiwi and strawberry drink. Noah, without shame, the most exquisite champagne on the menu") uses all diacritics and the foreign letters k and w.

Swedish   ("Flying snipes seek rest on soft tussocks") is missing q, x and z. Uses archaic spellings.
 ("Axe killer Julia Blomqvist on fencing in Switzerland") uses the name "Julia Blomqvist" and the Swedish name for Switzerland.
 ("Switzerland for luxury feather on branch behind oven") feels quite contrived.
 ("FAQ about Switzerland: Did you cleave a narrow village of ski boots?") uses the English abbreviation FAQ alongside some made-up compounds.
 ("Axe-handle carrier, give our WC zone-maiden IQ support")
 ("God help Zorn's girlfriend quickly get her pants off") uses both old fashioned words and contemporary names.
 ("Foal without pants went to the dove show") is missing q and z.

Turkish  ("The sick person in pyjamas quickly trusted the swarthy driver") contains all of the letters in the Turkish alphabet.

Other alphabetic scripts
Non-Latin alphabetic or phonetic scripts such as Greek, Cyrillic, and others can also have pangrams. In some writing systems, exactly what counts as a distinct symbol can be debated. For example, many languages have accents or other diacritics, but one might count "é" and "e" as the same for pangrams. A similar problem arises for older English orthography that includes the long s ("ſ").

Non-alphabetic scripts
Logographic scripts, or writing systems such as Chinese that do not use an alphabet but are composed principally of logograms, cannot produce pangrams in a literal sense (or at least, not pangrams of reasonable size). The total number of signs is large and imprecisely defined, so producing a text with every possible sign is practically impossible. However, various analogies to pangrams are feasible, including traditional pangrams in a romanization.

In Japanese, although typical orthography uses kanji (logograms), pangrams can be made using every kana, or syllabic character. The Iroha is a classic example of a perfect pangram in non-Latin script.

In Chinese, the Thousand Character Classic is a 1000-character poem in which each character is used exactly once; however, it does not include all Chinese characters. The single character  (permanence) incorporates all the basic strokes used to write Chinese characters, using each stroke exactly once, as described in the Eight Principles of Yong.

Among abugida scripts, an example of a perfect pangram is the Hanacaraka (hana caraka; data sawala; padha jayanya; maga bathanga) of the Javanese script, which is used to write the Javanese language in Indonesia.

Self-enumerating pangrams
A self-enumerating pangram is a pangrammatic autogram, or a sentence that inventories its own letters, each of which occurs at least once. The first example was produced by Rudy Kousbroek, a Dutch journalist and essayist, who publicly challenged Lee Sallows, a British recreational mathematician resident in the Netherlands, to produce an English translation of his Dutch pangram. In the sequel, Sallows built an electronic "pangram machine", that performed a  systematic search among millions of candidate solutions. The machine was successful in identifying the following 'magic' translation:

This pangram contains four As, one B, two Cs, one D, thirty Es, six Fs, five Gs, seven Hs, eleven Is, one J, one K, two Ls, two Ms, eighteen Ns, fifteen Os, two Ps, one Q, five Rs, twenty-seven Ss, eighteen Ts, two Us, seven Vs, eight Ws, two Xs, three Ys, & one Z.

Chris Patuzzo was able to reduce the problem of finding a self-enumerating pangram to the boolean satisfiability problem. He did this by using a made-to-order hardware description language as a stepping stone and then applied the Tseytin transformation to the resulting chip.

Pangrams in literature
The pangram "The quick brown fox jumps over the lazy dog", and the search for a shorter pangram, are the cornerstone of the plot of the novel Ella Minnow Pea by Mark Dunn. The search successfully comes to an end when the phrase "Pack my box with five dozen liquor jugs" is discovered.

The scientific paper Cneoridium dumosum (Nuttall) Hooker F. Collected March 26, 1960, at an Elevation of about 1450 Meters on Cerro Quemazón, 15 Miles South of Bahía de Los Angeles, Baja California, México, Apparently for a Southeastward Range Extension of Some 140 Miles has a pangrammatic title, seemingly by pure chance. As of January 2022, its English Wikipedia article is the only English Wikipedia article to have a pangrammatic title without having been constructed as a pangram.

See also

Panalphabetic window
Pangrammatic window
Pangrammatic lipogram
Heterogram - word, phrase, or sentence in which no letter of the alphabet occurs more than once
Lipogram, in which the aim is to omit one or more letters from a sentence

References

External links

Pangram finder within any text
List of pangrams | Clagnut
Fun With Words: Pangrams

 
Phrases
Word games
Typography
Test items